Tasuke, the Samurai Cop, known in Japanese as , is a manga series created by Manavu Kashimoto. It was adapted as an anime television series by Studio Pierrot broadcast in 22 episode on TV Tokyo (TX) from October 19, 1990 to March 22, 1991.

Tasuke, a student at the Metropolitan Police Academy, wishes to become a top police officer and defeat the criminals of Edo City.

Characters 
Tasuke (太助)

Voiced by: Yūko Mita

Omon-chan (おもんちゃん)

Voiced by:  Chieko Honda

Darth Benkei (ダース弁慶)

Voiced by:  Tesshō Genda

Kintaro Ninomiya  (二宮金太郎)

Voiced by:  Yuriko Fuchizaki

Ghengis Khan (ジンギス・ハーン)

Voiced by:  Mitsuo Iwata

School Director ( ダイブツ先生)

Voiced by: Kenichi Ogata

References

External links
 Tasuke, the Samurai Cop at Studio Pierrot
 Edokko Boy Gatten Tasuke at Studio Pierrot 
 

1990 anime television series debuts
1990 manga
Pierrot (company)
Shogakukan manga
TV Tokyo original programming
Shōnen manga